() is a county located in central Fujian province, People's Republic of China.

History

Dehua is rich in kaolin and famous for ceramic products, especially crafts and dinnerware, including candle holders, Piggy banks, photo frames, jewel boxes, flower baskets, jars, vases, plaques, wall plaques, garden decorations, figurines, statues; animals, birds, pets and many other items.

Kilns in Dehua are also attempting in recreating Jian ware.

Administrative divisions
Towns:
Xunzhong, Longxun, Sanban, Longmentan, Leifeng, Nancheng, Shuikou, Chishui, Gekeng, Shangyong

Townships:
Gaide Township, Yangmei Township, Tangtou Township, Guiyang Township, Guobao Township, Meihu Township, Daming Township, Chunmei Township

Economy 
In 2017 Dehua's GDP amounted to 22.1 billion Yuan.

Climate

See also
Dehua porcelain
Blanc de Chine

References

External links 

 Dehua County

County-level divisions of Fujian